"Righteously" is a song written and performed by American singer-songwriter Lucinda Williams. It was released in 2003 as the first single from her seventh album, World Without Tears (2003).

The song earned Williams a nomination for the Grammy Award for Best Female Rock Vocal Performance in 2004.

Reception
AllMusic said of the track "the muck and mire of 'Righteously', with its open six-string squall, is pure rock. It's an exhortation to a lover that he need not prove his manhood by being aloof, but to 'be the man you ought to tenderly/Stand up for me,' Doug Pettibone's overdriven, crunching guitar solo quotes both Duane Allman and Jimi Hendrix near the end of the tune." Robert Hilburn, in his review of World Without Tears for the Los Angeles Times, stated "The tempo picks up on 'Righteously', but the lyrics still speak of the search for some shelter in a stormy relationship. The fiery electric guitar underscores the desperation of the lyrics."

Country music website The Boot ranked the song No. 7 on their list of the best Lucinda Williams songs, writing "In a sense, 'Righteously' is a sophisticated update of 'Passionate Kisses'. The slow-burning, searing blues riffs convey the main character's stance that she deserves desire and respect (Be the man you ought to tenderly/Stand up for me), and that her man simply needs to love her, not impress her (You don't have to prove/Your manhood to me constantly." Music website Return of Rock ranked it No. 10 on their list of Williams best songs."

Track listing
CD single - US
 Radio Edit - 3:57
 Album Version - 4:36

CD single - Europe
 Radio Edit - 3:57
 Album Version - 4:36

Awards

Charts

References

External links
, official audio (no music video)

2003 songs
2003 singles
Lucinda Williams songs
Songs written by Lucinda Williams
Lost Highway Records singles